Tetratheca bauerifolia, commonly known as heath pink-bells, is a flowering plant in the family Elaeocarpaceae and is endemic to eastern Australia. It is a small compact shrub with pink-mauve flowers.

Description

Taxonomy
Tetratheca bauerifolia was first formally described by Victorian Government Botanist Ferdinand von Mueller in 1853 and the description was published in Synopsis Tremandrearum.

Distribution and habitat
Heath pink-bells grows mostly at higher altitudes in eucalypt forests in rocky locations south of Hill End in New South Wales. A widespread species in eastern Victoria usually in rocky locations or in open forests.

References

bauerifolia
Oxalidales of Australia
Flora of New South Wales
Flora of Victoria (Australia)
Taxa named by Ferdinand von Mueller